Augusta Ottilia Laine (née Brander; 30 March 1867, Tampere - 16 August 1949) was a Finnish teacher of home economics and politician. She was a member of the Parliament of Finland, representing the Young Finnish Party from 1917 to 1918 and the National Progressive Party from 1918 to 1919 and in 1922. She was the elder sister of Uuno, Helena and Akseli Brander. She was married to Johannes Laine.

References

1867 births
1949 deaths
Politicians  from Tampere
People from Häme Province (Grand Duchy of Finland)
Young Finnish Party politicians
National Progressive Party (Finland) politicians
Members of the Parliament of Finland (1917–19)
Members of the Parliament of Finland (1919–22)
People of the Finnish Civil War (White side)
Finnish schoolteachers
20th-century Finnish women politicians
Women members of the Parliament of Finland